Mówią Wieki (meaning Centuries Speak in English) is a monthly popular science and history magazine published in Poland since 1958.

Editors in chief:
 Maria Bogucka (1958–1976)
 Bożena Krzywobłocka (1976–1977)
 Eugeniusz Duraczyński (1977–1990)
 Stefan Meller (1990–1994)
 Jerzy Kochanowski (1995)
 Jarosław Krawczyk (1995–present

Many Polish historians have published pieces in that magazine, including Tadeusz Manteuffel, Aleksander Gieysztor, Jerzy Holzer, Barbara Grochulska, Andrzej Garlicki, Ewa Wipszycka, Stefan Kieniewicz, Antoni Mączak, Andrzej Wyrobisz, Andrzej Zahorski, Benedykt Zientara, Janusz Tazbir, Henryk Samsonowicz, Bronisław Geremek, Karol Modzelewski.

References

External links

1958 establishments in Poland
History magazines
Magazines established in 1958
Magazines published in Warsaw
Monthly magazines published in Poland
Polish-language magazines
Popular science magazines